The men's 200 metres at the 2011 World Championships in Athletics was held at the Daegu Stadium on September 2 and September 3. Usain Bolt, the world record holder and defending champion was the favourite going into the race with a world leading time of 19.86 seconds. He had also won his three major races after return from injury convincingly.

Remembering his false start in the 100 metres, favorite Bolt had the slowest reaction time to the gun, but cruised easily into the semi-finals.

The semi-finals began with another false start, but it was Sandro Viana.  Christophe Lemaitre led the qualifying winning semi 1, as Bolt casually cruised through semi 2 and Walter Dix ran a controlled semi 3.

The finals were Bolt's redemption.  Still cautious, Bolt had the slowest reaction time in the field, but he easily charged into the lead, making up the stagger on Dix 2/3 of the way through the turn as returning silver medalist Alonso Edward pulled up.  Bolt made one glance back at Dix and the rest of the field, then charged home in 19.40 his third best time, the number four time ever.  Dix was clearly second in 19.70, with Christophe Lemaitre separating from Jaysuma Saidy Ndure in 19.80, the French National Record for the bronze medal.  The rest of the field was more than 3/10ths of a second behind.  Note these were Fully automatic times, it was just a fluke that all the medal times were evenly divisible by a tenth of a second.

Medalists

Records
Prior to the competition, the men's 200 m records were as follows:

Qualification standards

Schedule

Results

Heats
Qualification: First 3 in each heat (Q) and the next 3 fastest (q) advance to the semifinals.

Wind:Heat 1: +0.3 m/s, Heat 2: -0.3 m/s, Heat 3: -1.1 m/s, Heat 4: -1.1 m/s, Heat 5: -0.8 m/s, Heat 6: +0.4 m/s, Heat 7: -0.7 m/s

Semifinals
Qualification: First 2 in each heat (Q) and the next 2 fastest (q) advance to the final.

Wind:Heat 1: -1.0 m/s, Heat 2: -1.0 m/s, Heat 3: -0.7 m/s

Final
Wind: +0.8 m/s

References

External links
200 metres results at IAAF website

Events at the 2011 World Championships in Athletics
200 metres at the World Athletics Championships